Duclauxin is a chemical compound isolated from Penicillium duclauxi.

Other chemical compounds which are derivatives of duclauxin are known, such as cryptoclauxin, bacillisporins, and talaromycesones. They are sometimes referred to collectively as duclauxins.

Notes

Penicillium
Isocoumarins